Carleen Maley Hutchins (May 24, 1911 – August 7, 2009) was an American high school science teacher, violinmaker and researcher, best known for her creation, in the 1950s/60s, of a family of eight proportionally-sized violins now known as the violin octet (e.g., the vertical viola) and for a considerable body of research into the acoustics of violins. She was born in Springfield, Massachusetts and worked at her home in Montclair, New Jersey.

Hutchins’ greatest innovation, still used by many violinmakers, was a technique known as free-plate tuning. When not attached to a violin, the top and back are called free plates. Her technique gives makers a precise way to refine these plates before a violin is assembled.

From 2002 to 2003, Hutchins’s octet was the subject of an exhibition at the Metropolitan Museum of Art in New York. Titled “The New Violin Family: Augmenting the String Section.”  Hutchins was the founder of the New Violin Family Association,
creator-in-chief of the Violin Octet, author of more than 100 technical publications, editor of two volumes of collected papers in violin acoustics, four grants from the Martha Baird Rockefeller Fund for Music, recipient of two Guggenheim Fellowships, an Honorary Fellowship from the Acoustical Society of America (ASA), and four honorary doctorates. In 1981, Hutchins also received the ASA Silver Medal in Musical Acoustics. In 1963, Hutchins co-founded the Catgut Acoustical Society, which develops scientific insights into the construction of new and conventional instruments of the violin family.

The Hutchins Consort, named after Hutchins, is a California ensemble featuring all eight instruments.

In 1974, Hutchins and Daniel W. Haines, using materials supplied by the Hercules Materials Company, Inc. (Allegany Ballistics Laboratory) of Cumberland, Maryland, developed a graphite-epoxy composite top that was determined to be a successful alternative to the traditional use of spruce for the violin belly.

References and notes

External links
The Carleen Hutchins Collection/Archive
The Hutchins Consort
 "Carleen Hutchins, Innovative Violin Maker, Is Dead at 98,"  New York Times, August 8, 2009

Further reading
American Luthier: Carleen Hutchins—the Art and Science of the Violin by Quincy Whitney, Foredge, 2016, 

1911 births
2009 deaths
American luthiers
People from Springfield, Massachusetts
People from Essex County, New Jersey
People from Wolfeboro, New Hampshire
20th-century American inventors
Cornell University alumni